, , and also translated as , or , is a Japanese idiom for the awareness of , or transience of things, and both a transient gentle sadness (or wistfulness) at their passing as well as a longer, deeper gentle sadness about this state being the reality of life.

Origins and analysis
It became central to his philosophy of literature; he saw it as the main theme of The Tale of Genji. His articulation was the result of well-established poetic readings of The Tale of Genji and the concept became central to his own; Genji was "instrumental" in the term's establishment. According to Norinaga, to "know"  is to have a shrewd understanding and consideration of reality and the assortment of occurrences present; to be affected by and appreciate the beauty of cherry blossoms was an example of this knowledge provided by Norinaga.

Japanese cultural scholar Kazumitsu Kato wrote that understanding  in the Heian period was "almost a necessity for a learned man in aristocratic society", a time when it was a prominent concept. Donald Richie wrote that the term has "a near-Buddhistic insistence upon recognition of the eternal flux of life upon this earth. This is the authentic Japanese attitude toward death and disaster". Various other scholars have discussed the term.

Etymology
Awareness of the transience of all things heightens appreciation of their beauty, and evokes a gentle sadness at their passing. Norinaga saw the state of being  as the fundamental condition of the concept.

The term has seen gradual change in its meaning, although since "the beginning it represented a feeling of a special kind: 'not a powerful surge of passion, but an emotion containing a balance".

In contemporary culture
 is "one of the most well-known concepts in traditional literary criticism in Japan". Norinaga asserted that the feeling of  may be so profound that allusions to senses, highlighting "the sound of wind or crickets,[...] the colour of flowers or snow", would be the only apt expression.

Notable manga artists who use -style storytelling include Hitoshi Ashinano, Kozue Amano, and Kaoru Mori. In anime, both Only Yesterday by Isao Takahata and Mai Mai Miracle by Sunao Katabuchi emphasize the passing of time in gentle notes and by presenting the main plot against a parallel one from the past.

By the 1970s,  had been adopted in Japanese and English film criticism with noted attention towards the Japanese director Yasujirō Ozu. Ozu has often expressed feelings by showing the faces of objects rather than the face of an actor. Some examples include two fathers contemplating the rocks in a "dry landscape" garden, and a mirror reflecting the absence of the daughter who has just left home after getting married.

Science fiction author Ken Liu's short story  won the 2013 Hugo Award for Best Short Story. Inspired by works like the science fiction manga , Liu sought to evoke an "aesthetic primarily oriented towards creating in the reader an empathy towards the inevitable passing of all things", and to acknowledge "the importance of memory and continuity with the past".

Akira Kurosawa's I Live in Fear and Shohei Imamura's Black Rain have been associated with the term.

See also
 Melancholia
 Vanitas
 This too shall pass, a Middle-Eastern adage regarding ephemerality
Related terms with no direct translation in English:
 
 
 Memento mori
 
 Nine Changes

Notes

References

External links
  from a Japanese culture class at Ohio State University

Concepts in aesthetics
Concepts in epistemology
Concepts in metaphilosophy
Concepts in metaphysics
Concepts in the philosophy of mind
Emotions
History of philosophy
Japanese aesthetics
Japanese literary terminology
Japanese philosophy
Japanese words and phrases
Melancholia
Metaphysical theories
Philosophy of life
Philosophy of mind
Words and phrases with no direct English translation